The WAC from Walla Walla is a 1952 American comedy film directed by William Witney and written by Arthur T. Horman. The film stars Judy Canova, Stephen Dunne, George Cleveland, June Vincent, Irene Ryan and Roy Barcroft. The film was released on October 10, 1952, by Republic Pictures.

Plot
Two families in a small town, the Canovas and the Mayfields are perpetually feuding. Each family prides themselves on their military tradition, with the Canovas having a statue of an ancestor who fought in the American Civil War holding a pride of place in the town with the Mayfields trying to replace it with one of their own Mayfield ancestors.

A Romeo and Juliet situation develops where Judy Canova is in love with Lieutenant Tom Mayfield of the Army Ordnance Corps, but Tom pays more attention to the glamorous Doris Vail. Vail tricks Judy into joining the Women's Army Corps to get rid of her. The joke is on Doris when Tom is enthralled with Judy's patriotism and accompanies her on the town hayride. When Doris finds out Judy will be sent to basic training at the same army post Tom is at, Doris enlists herself.

Following basic training, the pair get assigned to Tom's Ordnance unit that is testing a secret missile guidance device that attracts the attention of an enemy spy ring.

Cast     
Judy Canova as Judy Canova
Stephen Dunne as Lieutenant Tom Mayfield
George Cleveland as Gramps Canova
June Vincent as Doris Vail
Irene Ryan as Women's Army Corps Sergeant Kearns
Roy Barcroft as Mr. Prentiss
Allen Jenkins as Mr. Redington
George Chandler as Jud Canova
Elizabeth Slifer as Betty Canova
Thurston Hall as Colonel Mayfield
Ellanora Needles as Recruiting Sergeant 
Dick Wessel as Sergeant Malone
Pattie Chapman as Lizzie

References

External links

1952 films
1952 comedy films
1950s English-language films
1950s American films
American comedy films
Republic Pictures films
Films directed by William Witney
Military humor in film
American black-and-white films
English-language comedy films